Tamworth Rugby Union Football Club is an English rugby union club that plays in the Midlands Division.

Club honors
Staffordshire Intermediate Cup winners (2): 2009, 2011
Midlands 3 West (North) champions: 2015-16

References 

English rugby union teams
Sport in Tamworth, Staffordshire
Rugby clubs established in 1925
1925 establishments in England